Borivoje Rumenić (Serbian Cyrillic: Боривоје Руменић; born 10 May 1990) is a Serbian football goalkeeper who plays for Borac Čačak.

Career
Playing for Smederevo, he made his Superliga debut on 1 November 2009 in a 2-1 victory away to Hajduk Kula.

In the beginning of 2018, Rumenić went on a trial at FK Radnički 1923, having played for FK Tutin before that. He signed with Radnički in the summer 2018.

In 2019, he joined FK Polet Ljubić again.

References

External links
 Profile at Srbijafudbal

Living people
1990 births
Serbian footballers
Association football goalkeepers
FK Smederevo players
FK Hajduk Beograd players
FK Bežanija players
FK Tutin players
FK Sloga Petrovac na Mlavi players
FK Polet Ljubić players
FK Radnički 1923 players
FK Borac Čačak players
Serbian First League players
Serbian SuperLiga players